Strathmore-Brooks was a provincial electoral district in Alberta, Canada mandated to return a single member to the Legislative Assembly of Alberta using the first-past-the-post method of voting from 1997 to 2019.

History
The electoral district was created in the 1996 boundary re-distribution from most of the old electoral district of Bow Valley.

The 2004 electoral boundary re-distribution saw the boundaries revised to include a portion of land from the dissolved Drumheller-Chinook electoral district, and losing a small portion of the south-east portion of the district to Little Bow.

The 2010 electoral boundary re-distribution saw the electoral district completely untouched using exactly the same boundaries as set in 2003.

The Strathmore-Brooks electoral district was dissolved in the 2017 electoral boundary re-distribution, and portions of the district would form the Brooks-Medicine Hat, Olds-Didsbury-Three Hills and Chestermere-Strathmore electoral districts.

Boundary history

Representation history

The electoral district was created in 1997. The first election that year saw Progressive Conservative incumbent Lyle Oberg win the new district with over 70% of the popular vote. Oberg had served as MLA for Bow Valley from 1993 to 1997 before it was abolished.

After the election Oberg was appointed to serve in the cabinet of Premier Ralph Klein. He ran for his third term in the 2001 general election and won. He took a slightly higher percentage of the popular vote.

Oberg ran for his third term in the district and fourth as an MLA. His popularity started to slide. He was re-elected with a reduced majority losing over 10% of his popular vote.

Controversy would follow in 2006 after Oberg resigned his cabinet post to seek the leadership of the Progressive Conservative party in the wake of Ralph Klein's resignation. He was removed from Progressive Conservative caucus days later on March 22, 2006 and forced to sit as an Independent after suggesting that he knew where the skeletons were in the closet of the Progressive Conservative government.

Oberg ran for leadership of the party as an Independent and lost. He was readmitted to the caucus on July 25, 2006 by Premier Ed Stelmach and returned to cabinet. Oberg did not stand for re-election in 2008. The election that year returned Progressive Conservative candidate Arno Doerksen with a landslide majority.

In the 2012 General Election, Wildrose candidate Jason Hale defeated Doerksen by a comfortable margin as the party went on to dominate rural southern Alberta.

In December 2014, Hale crossed the floor with 8 other Wildrose MLAs to the Progressive Conservative Party. In January 2015, Derek Fildebrandt announced that he would seek the Wildrose nomination to challenge Hale. Hale announced his retirement from politics soon afterwards.

Fildebrandt went on to win the riding by a huge margin over PC candidate Molly Douglass in the 2015 General Election. Fildebrandt was subsequently appointed the Official Opposition Shadow Minister of Finance and Chairman of the Public Accounts Committee.

On July 22, Wildrose and PC members voted to join and form the United Conservative Party of Alberta (UCP). Fildebrandt was officially recognized as a UCP MLA on July 24. However, he was again removed from caucus and, this time, permanently banned from re-joining the UCP after a string of scandals including an illegal hunting charge that had not been disclosed to the party.

In 2018 Fildebrandt joined, and became leader of, the Freedom Conservative Party of Alberta (previously known as Alberta First, the Separation Party of Alberta, and the Western Freedom Party).

Legislature results

1997 general election

2001 general election

2004 general election

2008 general election

2012 general election

2015 general election

^ Alberta First change calculated from Separation Party.

Senate nominee results

2004 Senate nominee election district results
Voters had the option of selecting 4 Candidates on the Ballot

2012 Senate nominee election district results

Student Vote results

2004 election

On November 19, 2004 a Student Vote was conducted at participating Alberta schools to parallel the 2004 Alberta general election results. The vote was designed to educate students and simulate the electoral process for persons who have not yet reached the legal majority. The vote was conducted in 80 of the 83 provincial electoral districts with students voting for actual election candidates. Schools with a large student body that reside in another electoral district had the option to vote for candidates outside of the electoral district then where they were physically located.

2012 election

See also
List of Alberta provincial electoral districts
Brooks, Alberta a city in southern Alberta
Strathmore, Alberta a town in southern Alberta

References

Further reading

External links
Elections Alberta
The Legislative Assembly of Alberta

Former provincial electoral districts of Alberta
Brooks, Alberta